Saujil is the district head of the Pomán Department, of the west of the province of Catamarca (Argentina), that counts on about 5,000 hab., is made up of the following populations (north to south): 
 Colpes
 San José de Colpes
 Joyango 
 San Miguel
 Las Casitas
 Saujil
 El Potrero
 Rincón
 Michango
 Siján

Toponymy 
Its name means “Place of the light” in native language.

Tourism - External links 

 Provincial site (Spanish)

Populated places in Catamarca Province
Cities in Argentina
Argentina